S5 was an Indian pop band formed in 2004. The members of the band are Benny Dayal, Anaitha Nair, Suvi Suresh, Bhargavi Pillai and Arjun Sasi. They were the winners of the first SS Music voice hunt competition.

The band's only album "Isai" (English: "music") with 8 songs in Tamil language composed by Praveen Mani was released in March, 2005. They later sung and performed all songs for the Malayalam movie By the People. They also recorded a song "Vaa endru koopidum" as a band for composer Yuvan Shankar Raja for a movie named "Vyuham", but it was never released.

After one year the contract came to an end and the band split. Since then, all of them are pursuing their own careers. Benny Dayal has become a famous playback singer, Suvi Suresh has sung many hit songs in Tamil and Bhargavi Pillai in Telugu, while Anaitha Nair has become a Bollywood actress.

Discography
2005: Isai
2005: By the People

References

Indian pop music groups
Musical groups established in 2004